Buřenice is a municipality and village in Pelhřimov District in the Vysočina Region of the Czech Republic. It has about 200 inhabitants.

Administrative parts
Villages of Babice, Kyjov and Radějov are administrative parts of Buřenice.

References

Villages in Pelhřimov District